Roger Garland (born February 1933) is an Irish environmental activist and a former Green Party politician who served as a Teachta Dála (TD) for the Dublin South constituency from 1989 to 1992.

He was the Green Party's first candidate to be elected to Dáil Éireann.

Biography
Garland was educated at Castleknock College in Dublin.

He stood for the Green Party in the 1989 general election, and was elected to represent Dublin South, becoming the party's first ever TD. Garland lost his seat following the 1992 general election with a dramatic fall in his vote, dropping from 8.8% in 1989 to 3.8%, which was among the lowest votes for a sitting TD.

At the 1994 European Parliament election, Garland backed an independent Green candidate Peter Sweetman, over the official Green Party candidate, Nuala Ahern, in the Leinster constituency. Ahern went on to win the seat, to the surprise of many, and an attempt was made to throw Garland out of the party for his disloyalty, including vote in a specially convened party council. Following the 2007 general election, Garland was one of the leading internal critics of the Greens' decision to enter coalition with Fianna Fáil.

In 1997, he helped found Friends of the Irish Environment, which is a network of Independent Environmentalists, along with other environmental activists Tony Lowes, David Healy, Peter Sweetman, and Sarah Dillon. He is currently chairman of the Keep Ireland Open (KIO) group. He is also a current member of the environmental board of An Taisce the National Trust For Ireland, its most influential environmental body.

References

1933 births
Living people
Green Party (Ireland) TDs
Irish environmentalists
Members of the 26th Dáil
People educated at Castleknock College